The Vianna da Motta International Music Competition was first constituted in 1957 in Lisbon in honor of José Vianna da Motta by his disciple Sequeira Costa, who remains its president; this inaugural edition was won by Naum Shtarkman. The competition, a member of the World Federation of International Music Competitions, has been held regularly since 1964.

Awards

While mainly a piano competition, two violin editions have been held. In 1973 Ida Kavafian and Gerardo Ribeiro shared the 1st prize. In 1991 it was declared void; Graf Mourja and Rachel Varga were awarded, respectively, the 2nd and 3rd prizes.

References
 http://www.fmcim.org/comp/comp.php?lang=en&comp_id=765&menu=1 World Federation of International Music Competitions
 http://www.alink-argerich.org/ Argerich Foundation

External links
 Official webpage

Piano competitions
Violin competitions